Stenoptinea is a genus of the fungus moth family, Tineidae. Therein, it belongs to the subfamily Meessiinae. It was originally established as a subgenus of Homosetia, but later separated to become a genus in its own right.

Only three species are placed in Stenoptinea at present:
 Stenoptinea auriferella (Dietz, 1905)
 Stenoptinea cyaneimarmorella (Millière, 1854) (= S. angustipennis)
 Stenoptinea ornatella (Dietz, 1905)

Footnotes

References

  (2004): Butterflies and Moths of the World, Generic Names and their Type-species – Stenoptinea. Version of 2004-NOV-05. Retrieved 2010-MAY-05.
  [2010]: Global Taxonomic Database of Tineidae (Lepidoptera). Retrieved 2010-MAY-05.
  (2003): Markku Savela's Lepidoptera and some other life forms – Stenoptinea. Version of 2003-DEC-28. Retrieved 2010-MAY-03.

Meessiinae
Moth genera